The Richardson River is a waterway that flows into Richardson Bay, Coronation Gulf in the northern Canadian territory of Nunavut. Its mouth is situated northwest of Kugluktuk, Nunavut.

The Richardson River is named in honour of Sir John Richardson, a Scottish naval surgeon, naturalist and arctic explorer of the region.

See also
List of rivers of Nunavut

References

Rivers of Kitikmeot Region